Rodolfo Usigli (November 17, 1905 – June 18, 1979) was a Mexican playwright, essayist and diplomat. He has been called "the father of Mexican theater" and "playwright of the Mexican Revolution." In recognition of his work to articulate a national identity for Mexican theater, he was award the Premio Nacional de Ciencias y Artes (Mexican National Prize for Arts and Sciences) in 1972.

Biography
Usigli was born to an Italian father and a Polish mother in Mexico City. In his early childhood, he enjoyed many plays that his parents took him to. His father aspired him to go to music school, and Usigli spent a year in the National Conservatory of Music before deciding that his real passion was theater. He studied drama at the Yale School of Drama from 1935-1936 on a Rockefeller scholarship, later becoming a professor and diplomat. It was during his time as a diplomat in 1945 that he met George Bernard Shaw in London. After returning to Mexico from the U.S., he established the Midnight Theater and also became a member of the literary circle that formed around the journal Contemporary.  During the 1930s, he directed radio dramas.

Theatre 
Usigli’s theater focuses largely the history of Mexico and satirizing his contemporary Mexican society, and how the Mexican middle classes were betrayed, politically and socially, by the Mexican revolution. His plays reflect a sense of the hypocrisies of life after the revolution, both criticizing society and offering models to emulate. He called for a national theater movement that would reflect the truth of the Mexican experience and express the Mexican spirit.

He is perhaps best known for his 1938 play El gesticulador (The Imposter), which critiqued social issues ravaging Mexico, such as misuse of power that the bureaucracy had got from the Revolution of 1910. The play was censored by the Mexican government banned, raising Usigli's reputation.

In 1942 Usigli published another work of scathing quality. In Family Dinner at Home''' his intended target were the apex strata of the Mexican social structure. Usigli experimented with crime fiction in the novel, Ensayo de un crimen (Rehearsal for a Crime), which in 1955 was adapted into a film, The Criminal Life of Archibaldo de la Cruz, by Luis Buñuel. Usigli also wrote several essays on history, art and theater. He was also an occasional poet, writing modest but interesting poems.

The award-winning Usigli believed the objective of theatre was to tell the truth about society. He was known for his strong representation of women in plays.

Usigli designed strong female characters in several of his plays. Two of Usigli's protégées, Rosario Castellanos and Luisa Josefina Hernández, became important female voices on the Mexican stage. He was also a strong influence on his pupil Jorge Ibargüengoitia and on Josefina Niggli.

 Archive 
The Rodolfo Usigli Archive in the Walter Havighurst Special Collections at Miami University of Ohio is a repository of Usigli's papers. The Archive's website describes it as "the definitive research collection relating to Usigli's life and career, including correspondence, both manuscript and typed drafts of original plays and translations of works by other artists, personal, theatrical, and diplomatic photographs, essays, books, playbills, posters, theses written about Usigli, awards, newspaper and magazine articles, memorabilia, and ephemera."

 Selected works 

 Plays 

 Tres comedias impolíticas (Three Impolitic Comedies), 1935El niño y la niebla (The Boy and the Mist), 1936Otra primavera (Another Spring)Medio tono (Middle Class)Mientras amemos (As Long as We Love), begun 1937-38, completed 1948
 El gesticulador (The Imposter), 1938
 La familia cena en casa (Family Dinner at Home), 1942
 Vacaciones (Holidays) La mujer no hace milagros (The Woman Does Not Work Miracles)La función de la despedida, 1949Los fugitivos, produced 1950, published 1951Jano es una muchacha, 1952Las madres, 1960
 The Corona Trilogy:
 Corona de sombra (Crown of Shadow), 1943
 Corona de Fuego (Crown of Fire), 1960
 Corona de Luz, (Crown of Light), 1963

 Poetry 

 Conversación desesperada (Desperate Conversation), 1938Sonetos del tiempo y de la muerte (Sonnets of Time and Death), 1954
 Tiempo y memoria en conversación desesperada, 1981

 Novels 

 Ensayo de un crimen (Rehearsal for a Crime), 1944

 Non-fiction 

 México en el teatro (Mexico in Theatre), 1932 Caminos del teatro en México (Paths of the Theatre in Mexico), 1933
 Anatomía del teatro (Anatomy of Theatre), written 1939, published 1967
 Itinerario del autor dramático (Itinerary of a Dramatist), 1940
 Juan Ruiz de Alarcón en el tiempo, 1967
 Ideas sobre el teatro (Ideas about the Theatre), 1968
 Imagen y prisma de México (1972)

 Memoirs 

 Conversaciónes y encuentros (Conversations and Encounters), 1974
 translated into English in a critical edition as You Have Nothing to Learn from Me: A Literary Relationship Between George Bernard Shaw and Rodolfo Usigli'', 2011.

External links

Rodolfo Usigli website at Miami University of Ohio
The Rodolfo Usigli Archive in the Walter Havighurst Special Collections at Miami University of Ohio
Rodolfo Usigli website at biblioteca Cervantes Virtual

References

1905 births
1979 deaths
Mexican people of Italian descent
Mexican people of Polish descent
Mexican dramatists and playwrights
People from Mexico City
Yale School of Drama alumni
20th-century American dramatists and playwrights
Occasional poets